The Sackville Blazers are a Canadian Junior ice hockey team from Lower Sackville, Nova Scotia.  The Blazers play in the Nova Scotia Junior Hockey League and are the only team in history to have won three consecutive Don Johnson Cups as Maritime Junior B Champions.

History
The Sackville Blazers became a reality for the 1982/83 season.  This came after seven years of hard work to gain entry into Junior hockey for Sackville.  Starting with the 1997/98 season, the Blazers have had a continuous run of finishing first overall season after season.

The Sackville Blazers' Maritime dynasty began with the 2002–03 season.  After winning the NSJBHL Championship, the Blazers went on to the Don Johnson Cup.  After finishing first in the round robin with winds including 7–3 over the St. John's Junior Hockey League's St. John's Jr. Celtics, 6–1 over the Island Junior Hockey League's Sherwood Falcons, and 5–1 over the host Mt. Pearl Jr. Blades, the Blazers received a bye directly into the final.  Sackville met Mt. Pearl again and dispatched them 6–4 to win their first Maritime Junior B Championship.

In 2004, the Blazers won their second straight NSJBHL title to move on to the Don Johnson Cup again.  Starting off with a 6–2 loss to the Island Junior Hockey League's Kensington Vipers, the Blazers needed to win their final two games to guarantee another shot at the Cup.  The Blazers knocked off the St. John's Junior Hockey League's Conception Bay North Jr. Stars and the host Antigonish Bulldogs to clinch a spot in the semi-final.  In the semi-final, they again defeated Conception Bay North 7–2 and in the final they avenged their only loss with a 3–2 win over Kensington to win their second straight Don Johnson Cup.

In 2005, the Blazers again won their league championship, their third in consecutive years.  They entered the Don Johnson Cup as one of only three teams to have won two consecutive titles (Antigonish Bulldogs and St. John's Jr. 50's begin the other two) with an opportunity to make history.  The Blazers kicked off the tournament with a 6–1 romp over the Kensington Vipers and a 10–3 demolishing of the St. John's League's Trinity Placentia Flyers.  In their final round robin game, they dropped a win to the host Strait Pirates and lost their bye to the tournament final.  In the semi-final, the Blazers again beat Trinity Placentia 4–2 and in the final they avenged their loss to Strait 1–0 to clinch their third consecutive Don Johnson Cup—the only team in history to win three in a row.

In 2012–13, the Blazers would finish the season in second place with a record of 20-12-2.  The Blazers would win the Nova Scotia playoffs and move on to the Don Johnson Memorial Cup in Moncton, New Brunswick.  The Blazers finished second in the round robin with a record of two wins, a loss, and a regulation tie.  The Blazers started the tournament with a 5–4 win over the New Brunswick Junior B Hockey League's Fredericton Caps.  The next game, the Blazers lost 6–1 to the Island Junior Hockey League's Kensington Vipers.  In their third game, the Blazers lost 3–2 in overtime to the St. John's Junior Hockey League's St. John's Jr. Caps.  In their final round robin game, Sackville defeated the host Mocton Vito's 4–3.  In the semi-final, the Blazers avenged their earlier overtime loss to the St. John's Jr. Caps by defeating them 6–5 in overtime.  Sackville would drop the final to the Kensington Vipers in a close 4–3 decision.

Season-by-season record

Don Johnson Cup
Eastern Canada Jr B Championships

External links
 Sackville Blazers Website
 Nova Scotia Junior Hockey League Website

Ice hockey teams in Nova Scotia
Ice hockey clubs established in 1982
1982 establishments in Nova Scotia
Sackville, New Brunswick